John Dassy was a 17th-century Anglican clergyman.

He was Archdeacon of Cashel from 1669 until 1691.

References 

17th-century Irish Anglican priests
Archdeacons of Cashel
People from Cardigan, Ceredigion
Alumni of Trinity College Dublin